The Ulster Junior Club Football Championship is an annual Gaelic football tournament played between the hundreds of junior football clubs in Ulster. There are nine county championships between the nine counties of Ulster. The nine winners go on to play each other in the Ulster Club Championship in a knock-out format. The winners go on to compete with the Connacht, Leinster, Munster and London champions in the All-Ireland Junior Club Football Championship.

Roll of honour

Wins listed by county

No club from Antrim, Derry, Down, or Fermanagh has ever won the Ulster Junior Club Football Championship.

See also
 Munster Junior Club Football Championship
 Leinster Junior Club Football Championship
 Connacht Junior Club Football Championship

References

3